is a Japanese professional footballer who plays as a winger or a midfielder for J1 League club Cerezo Osaka.

Career
Tameda was born in Nagasaki and played youth football with Oita Trinita U-18s before starting his professional career with the senior team in 2010. He remains their youngest player to participate in a league game, debuting at 17 years and 33 days old. After six seasons with Trinita and a short period of time at Avispa Fukuoka in 2016, Tameda was loaned to JEF United Chiba in 2017 and made a permanent move to the club in 2018. In 2021, Tameda moved to J1 League club Cerezo Osaka.

Career statistics

Club

References

External links

Profile at Cerezo Osaka

1993 births
Living people
Association football people from Nagasaki Prefecture
Japanese footballers
J1 League players
J2 League players
Oita Trinita players
Avispa Fukuoka players
JEF United Chiba players
Cerezo Osaka players
Association football midfielders